Giovan Battista Dell'Era (1766 in Treviglio – 1798 in Florence) was an Italian painter.

He was the son of a brazier, but his predilection for art induced him to go to Bergamo and become a pupil of Francesco Dagiù, called Capella. In 1785 he went to Rome, and there befriended Angelica Kauffman, with whom he painted several pictures. For the Empress Catharine of Russia, he copied seven of the best masterpieces in the galleries of Rome. He painted the theater curtain (sipario) for the Theater at Arezzo. He died at Florence in 1798. His best work is the Esther before Ahasuerus for the basilica of San Martino in Alzano Maggiore, near Bergamo. His son Raffaele who was also training as an artist died in Florence at 22 years of age.

Notes

References

Attribution:
 

1766 births
1798 deaths
18th-century Italian painters
Italian male painters
People from Treviglio
18th-century Italian male artists